Bettsburg is a community in Ludlow Parish, Northumberland County in the province of New Brunswick, Canada.

History

See also
List of communities in New Brunswick
List of people from Northumberland County, New Brunswick

References

Communities in Northumberland County, New Brunswick